Marat Safin was the defending champion and won in the final 6–2, 6–2 against Yevgeny Kafelnikov.

Seeds
A champion seed is indicated in bold text while text in italics indicates the round in which that seed was eliminated.

Draw

Finals

References

ATP Tashkent Open
2001 ATP Tour